Naomi Osaka defeated Petra Kvitová in the final, 7–6(7–2), 5–7, 6–4 to win the women's singles tennis title at the 2019 Australian Open. With the win, Osaka became the world No. 1 and became the first player since Jennifer Capriati to win their first two major titles at consecutive events. Ten players were in contention for the world No. 1 ranking. In addition to Kvitová, Osaka, and reigning world No. 1 Simona Halep, Sloane Stephens, Karolína Plíšková, Angelique Kerber, Elina Svitolina, Kiki Bertens, Aryna Sabalenka and Daria Kasatkina were also in contention for the top spot.	

Caroline Wozniacki was the defending champion, but lost in the third round to Maria Sharapova.

This was the first Australian Open to feature a final set tiebreak. When the score in a final set reached 6–6, the first player to reach 10 points and lead by at least 2 points won the set (and the match). Katie Boulter and Ekaterina Makarova became the first players to activate this rule in the main draw, with Boulter emerging victorious.

This was the first major main draw appearance of future world No. 1 and three-time major champion Iga Świątek, who lost to Camila Giorgi in the second round. Amanda Anisimova became the first player born in the 21st century to reach the fourth round of a singles major. Ashleigh Barty also became the first Australian to reach the quarterfinals since Jelena Dokic in 2009.

For the first time since 2009 Wimbledon, all of the top eight seeds reached the third round at a women's singles major.

Seeds
Seeding per WTA rankings.

Qualifying

Wildcards

Draw

Finals

Top half

Section 1

Section 2

Section 3

Section 4

Bottom half

Section 5

Section 6

Section 7

Section 8

Championship match statistics

References
General
Draw

Specific

External links
 2019 Australian Open – Women's draws and results at the International Tennis Federation

Women's Singles
2019
2019 in Australian women's sport
2019 WTA Tour
2019 in women's tennis